The SFAN 5 was a two-seat French motor-glider built in the late 1930s.

Specifications

References

1930s French sport aircraft
Single-engined tractor aircraft
High-wing aircraft
Aircraft first flown in 1936